Abacarus sacchari, the sugarcane rust mite, is an agricultural pest mite mostly on sugar cane plantations in Africa, Brazil, India, Guatemala, Costa Rica and Venezuela.

References

Agricultural pest mites
Eriophyidae
Animals described in 1966
Arachnids of Africa
Arachnids of South America